John Stammers (born 1954 Islington, London) is a British poet and writer.

Life
Stammers read philosophy at King's College London and is an Associate of King's College. He took up writing poetry in his 30s, joining Michael Donaghy’s City University poetry group. Stammers now teaches at City Lit. In 2002/03 he was appointed Judith E Wilson Fellow at the University of Cambridge. He has edited Magma magazine and was convenor of the British and Irish Contemporary Poetry Conference. His work has also appeared in London Review of Books, The New Republic, Poetry Daily (US), Poetry Review and various broadsheets.

Stammers lives in London with his wife and their two sons.

Awards
 2001 Forward Prize for Best First Collection (for Panoramic Lounge-Bar)
 2001 Whitbread Poetry Award shortlisted  (for Panoramic Lounge-Bar)
 2005 Waterstones Best New Poetry (for 'Stolen Love Behaviour')
 2005 Poetry Book Society Choice (for 'Stolen Love Behaviour')
 2005 Forward Prize for Best Collection (shortlist) (for 'Stolen Love Behaviour')
 2005 TS Eliot Award (shortlist)(for 'Stolen Love Behaviour')

Works
 Panoramic Lounge-bar (Picador, 2001) 
 Buffalo Bills  (pamphlet, Donut Press, 2004)
 Stolen Love Behaviour (Picador, 2005)
 Interior Night (Picador, 2010) 
 The Picador Book of Love Poems (Editor, Picador, 2011) 
 ''Gerard Manley Hopkins - Poet to Poet (Editor, Faber and Faber, 2012)

References

External links
 "John Stammers", Poetry International UK
 Author's blog
 "The Marshes" The Guardian 29 January 2005
 "Furthermore the Avenue"; "Younger", Limelight Issue 1: July 2003 by Stammers
 Jacket 22 "Caroline Bergvall in conversation with John Stammers" May 2003

1954 births
Living people
Alumni of King's College London
Associates of King's College London
British poets
British male poets